Leon Kauffman Roberts (born January 22, 1951) is a former corner outfielder in Major League Baseball who played from 1974 through 1984 for the Detroit Tigers, Houston Astros, Seattle Mariners, Texas Rangers, Toronto Blue Jays and Kansas City Royals. Listed at 6' 3", 200 lb., Roberts batted and threw right handed.

Career
Roberts was born in Vicksburg, Michigan, and graduated from Portage Northern High School, where he played baseball, football, basketball and ran track. He attended the University of Michigan, originally recruited to play football by coach Bo Schembechler. He played three years of college baseball and college basketball for the Michigan Wolverines.

He was drafted by Detroit and eventually earned the dubious honor of replacing Al Kaline in right field for the Tigers.

Roberts was dealt along with Terry Humphrey, Gene Pentz and Mark Lemongello from the Tigers to the Astros for Milt May, Dave Roberts and Jim Crawford on December 6, 1975. With the Mariners needing a right-handed power-hitting outfielder and the Astros more speed and infield depth, he was sent to Seattle for Jimmy Sexton two years later on December 5, 1977.

His most productive season came in 1978, when he led the Mariners with a .301 batting average, good for sixth in the American League. In the Opening Game, he belted a grand slam off Minnesota Twins pitcher Geoff Zahn.

He was traded along with Willie Horton, Rick Honeycutt, Mario Mendoza and Larry Cox from the Mariners to the Texas Rangers for Richie Zisk, Jerry Don Gleaton, Rick Auerbach, Ken Clay, Brian Allard and minor-league right-handed pitcher Steve Finch in an 11-player blockbuster deal on December 18, 1980.

On February 5, 1983, Roberts was traded by the Blue Jays to the Royals for a young Cecil Fielder. He also pitched one inning for Kansas City in 1984, giving up three earned runs. He played his last game on September 30, 1984.

At the end of his career it was discovered that Roberts had seriously bad eyesight due to an accident when he was a child. "I have real bad eyes," Roberts said, "I stabbed my eye with a knife when I was a kid. I was goofing around with my jackknife. I kept it hidden because I wanted to be a ballplayer. I had bad focusing point in my right eye and bad depth perception in my left eye, but I kept it secret so I wouldn’t be released. I never told anyone that I had such bad vision in my right eye, not a manager, not a teammate, not anyone. When we had our physicals in spring training there would be a long line, just like a cattle call. I would sneak up and read the line they wanted us to read and memorize it. Then when I got up there I’d just recite what I’d memorized. No one ever figured it out. I would always force myself to really concentrate on reading the ball and tracking the ball."

In an 11-season career, Roberts posted a batting average of .267 (731-for-2,737) with 78 home runs and 328 RBI in 901 games played. Following his professional playing career, he began a career managing in the Minor Leagues.

Roberts played winter ball with the Leones del Caracas club of the Venezuelan League during the 1977–1978 season.

References

External links

 Career statistics and player information from Baseball-Reference, or Baseball-Reference (Minors)
 Baseball Gauge
 Retrosheet
 Leon Roberts -- Tigers' Star Rookie, Ludington Daily News, May 15, 1975
 Houston, Detroit Swap 7, Daytona Beach Morning Journal, December 7, 1975
 Outside of Seattle, nobody knows Leon Roberts, Ellensburg Daily Record (UPI story), September 1, 1978
 Royals pick up Roberts in deal for minor leaguer, Lawrence Journal-World (AP story), February 5, 1983
 Roberts Dismissed As Hen Manager, Toledo Blade, September 17, 1987

1951 births
Living people
American expatriate baseball players in Canada
Baseball players from Michigan
Charleston Charlies players
Detroit Tigers players
Durham Bulls managers
Evansville Triplets players
Houston Astros players
Kansas City Royals players
Lakeland Tigers players
Leones del Caracas players
American expatriate baseball players in Venezuela
Major League Baseball outfielders
Michigan Wolverines baseball players
Montgomery Rebels players
Nashville Sounds managers
Nashville Sounds players
People from Vicksburg, Michigan
Rocky Mount Leafs players
San Bernardino Pride players
Seattle Mariners players
Tampa Bay Devil Rays coaches
Texas Rangers players
Toledo Mud Hens managers
Toronto Blue Jays players
Winter Haven Super Sox players
Michigan Wolverines men's basketball players